Race Davies (born 10 August 1962 in Moglabazar, Sylhet, East Pakistan (now Bangladesh), is a British actress and artist. She played Jackie Owen in EastEnders from 1999 to 2000.

Her first television appearance was in The Bill in 1988. In 1991 she landed a significant supporting role, playing Beverly Armitage in the comedy series Lazarus and Dingwall which aired on BBC2. She has also appeared  in Sean's Show, Men Behaving Badly, Holby City and Kavanagh QC.

More recently, she worked on the PlayStation 3 game Heavenly Sword, providing motion capture for and voicing the character Whiptail. She appears in DmC: Devil May Cry as the succubus Poison.

She appeared in Hollyoaks in late June 2009 as Christine Carpenter, mother of already established characters Zoe and Archie Carpenter.

Filmography

Film

Television

Video games

External links

 racedavies.com

British soap opera actresses
British video game actresses
British voice actresses
1962 births
Living people